1980 Japanese Super Cup was the Japanese Super Cup competition. The match was played at Osaka Nagai Stadium in Osaka on April 6, 1980. Mitsubishi Motors won the championship.

Match details

References

Japanese Super Cup
1980 in Japanese football
Shonan Bellmare matches
Urawa Red Diamonds matches